Leaked in London is a live EP that was recorded by American rock band Fall Out Boy on January 29, 2007. It was released in response to the band's third album, Infinity on High, being leaked onto the internet on January 19, 2007, three weeks before its official scheduled release. The EP could be downloaded from the band's website between Tuesday, February 6, 2007 and Tuesday, February 13, 2007 using the CDPass software along with inserting a physical copy of Infinity on High into the CD-ROM drive of one's computer.

Track listing 

Notes
 These live versions of "Thriller", "Dance, Dance" and "Our Lawyer..." were also released as B-sides to "Thnks fr th Mmrs".
 These five live tracks are also available as bonus tracks on the limited Australian and New Zealand "Platinum Edition" CD/DVD pressings of Infinity on High.

Personnel 
 Patrick Stump – lead vocals, rhythm guitar, piano
 Pete Wentz – bass guitar, backing vocals
 Joe Trohman – lead guitar, backing vocals
 Andy Hurley – drums

References

External links 
 The album was available from this URL with the Infinity on High CD in CD drive.

Fall Out Boy albums
2007 live albums
2007 EPs
Live EPs